Burlington Centre (formerly known as Burlington Mall) is a  shopping mall located in Burlington, Ontario, Canada. It is one of the two enclosed malls in Burlington, Ontario, the other being the Mapleview Centre. The stores at Burlington Centre include Hudson's Bay, Homesense, Old Navy and Winners. It has two floors, the upper floor covers the wing leading to the food court, the floor above the food court area, and the second floor of Hudson's Bay. The Hudson's Bay store gained national media attention in 2021 for its Zellers pop-up shop.

The mall was developed by Cambridge Leasoholds and opened its doors in October 1968. It was a 60-store complex anchored by Simpsons-Sears, Dominion, G.W Robinson and Famous Players. Sears sold its store lease and fixtures to The Bay which took over the location on August 14, 1991. In 1995, the Hudson's Bay Company bought the Robinson's chain and transferred the location at Burlington Mall to its Zellers subsidiary since there was already The Bay in the mall. Zellers eventually closed on September 17, 2012, and was replaced by Target Canada which opened on March 19, 2013. After Target closed itself in early 2015, its space was divided for a Denninger’s grocery retailer and relocated stores of Winners, Indigo  and Starbucks stores.

Burlington Centre is located at the intersections of Guelph Line, Fairview and Prospect Streets, south of the Queen Elizabeth Way (QEW). The mall is owned by RioCan Management Inc., and was owned until mid-2011 by Ivanhoe Cambridge.

Services
On the first floor there are retail stores and on the second floor there are Medical, Dental, Professional offices. Just outside the mall to the south there is a farmers' market. The Burlington Centre Farmers' Market has been held since 1959.

Notes

References
 Ladurantaye, Steve. "Primaris Retail REIT buys five shopping centres". Globe and Mail. May 24, 2011
 Song, Vivian.  "Bereaved mom: Docs should pay; Tracey Smith says more must be done to stop disabled drivers".  Toronto Sun.  September 29, 2005.  Pg. 39.
 Song, Vivian.  "Too old for the road?  Driver, 84, failed to stop; Some urge for drivers over 65, but seniors cry 'discrimination'".  Edmonton Sun.  March 20, 2006.  Pg. 30.

External links
Official website
 RioCan Official Website

Buildings and structures in Burlington, Ontario
Shopping malls in Ontario
Shopping malls established in 1968
Tourist attractions in the Regional Municipality of Halton